Even As We Speak is an Australian indie band from Sydney. Formed in the mid-1980s, founding members Matthew Love (guitar, banjo, vocals) and Mary Wyer (vocals, guitar) were later joined by Rob Irwin (bass) Anita Rayner (drums, banjo, mandolin), Paul Clarke (guitar, vocals) and Julian Knowles (keyboards, guitar, production).

History
After a series of vinyl releases on Australian independent labels including Phantom Records, and success on the Australian indie scene, they came to the attention of BBC Radio 1 DJ John Peel who started to play the band's Phantom Records single 'Goes So Slow' on his show. This brought them to the attention of UK audiences and began a relationship with UK indie label Sarah Records. The band released several singles and an album on Sarah Records, three of which reached the Top 5 of the Melody Maker and New Musical Express UK independent music charts in 1992 and 1993.

Between 1992 and 1993, the group recorded three sessions for John Peel and one session for Mark Goodier for BBC Radio 1. They were among the few Australian bands to record Peel Sessions – others were The Birthday Party, The Triffids, The Go-Betweens and Laughing Clowns. These sessions were released as the album 'Yellow Food: The Peel Sessions'<ref name="Yellow Food: The Peel Sessions" in June 2014. A session was also recorded for Radio France.

Wyer formed a pop rock band, Her Name in Lights, which issued their debut album, Into the Light Again, in October 2004. Egg Records of Glasgow has compiled Even As We Speak's five Australian vinyl singles into a 17-song CD, A Three Minute Song is One Minute Too Long (2007).

In 2016, the band reformed (minus Paul Clarke) to play NYC Popfest and added some further shows to mark the release of 'Yellow Food: The Peel Sessions', a compilation album of the complete sessions recorded for the BBC between 1992 and 1993. This led to the band recording and releasing a 5 track EP of new material, The Black Forest, on 10-inch vinyl and CD through Emotional Response Records in the US in September 2017.

In 2018, a 25-year re-issue of the Sarah Records LP Feral Pop Frenzy was released on Emotional Response and also as a Rough Trade coloured vinyl exclusive in the UK and USA. The band toured the UK in July 2018 headlining a bill with a classic Sarah Records lineup of Secret Shine, Boyracer and Action Painting!, finishing with a headline slot on the Loco Stage at the Indietracks festival.

The full-length album Adelphi was released 24 July 2020 on Shelflife Records.

Discography

Albums
 Feral Pop Frenzy (1993), Sarah Records – 12-inch/CD
 Feral Pop Frenzy (1993), Quattro – Japan CD, includes extra tracks
 A Three Minute Song Is One Minute Too Long (2005), Egg Records – CD compilation
 Yellow Food: The Peel Sessions (2014), Feral Pop Records – digital release
 Yellow Food: The Peel Sessions (2017), Emotional Response Records – U.S. limited edition CD
 Feral Pop Frenzy (2018), Emotional Response Records – U.S. 25-year 12-inch red/white spatter vinyl reissue
 Feral Pop Frenzy (2018), Rough Trade Records – exclusive 25-year white vinyl reissue
 Adelphi (2020), Shelflife Records

Singles and EPs
 "Small Fish in a Big Machine" (1986), Voyeur Records – 7-inch 45 rpm
 I Won't Have to Think About You (1987), Big Home Productions – 7-inch EP
 "Blue Suburban Skies" (1987), Big Home Productions – 7-inch 45 rpm
 "Goes So Slow" (1989), Phantom Records – limited edition red 7-inch vinyl
 Outgrown This Town (1990), Phantom Records – 12-inch EP
 Nothing Ever Happens (1990), Sarah Records – 7-inch EP
 One Step Forward (1991), Sarah Records – 7-inch 33⅓ rpm EP
 "Beautiful Day" (1991), Sarah Records – 7-inch
 Blue Eyes Deceiving Me (1993), Sarah Records – 7-inch/CD EP
 "Even As We Speak/In a Day" (2000), Gifted Records – 7-inch 33⅓ rpm split single
 "Such a Good Feeling" (2017), Emotional Response Records  – U.S. digital release
 The Black Forest (2017), Emotional Response Records – U.S. 10-inch vinyl, CD and digital EP
 "Blue Suburban Skies" (2020), Optic Nerve Records – U.K. 7-inch 45 rpm (Limited edition coloured vinyl)

References

External links
Even As We Speak Band website
 List of Peel Sessions
 Sarah Records documentary
 Julian Knowles

Australian indie pop groups
Australian indie rock groups
Sarah Records artists
Musical groups from Sydney
Musical groups established in 1986